Liberty High School is a public high school in North Liberty, Iowa, located within the Iowa City Community School District. It opened in August 2017.

Facilities
The school building, designed by SVPA Architects, Inc. in 2014, began construction in May 2015. The cost of construction was $75 million.

Liberty High opened to the public on August 12, 2017. The first day of classes began on August 23, 2017.

Student body
The Iowa City Community School Board voted in January 2015 to open Liberty High as a comprehensive high school. In May, it was announced that North Central Junior High School would become the feeder school for Liberty High. However, the decision was overturned a year later.

Approximately 700 students, most of whom were slated to attend Iowa City West High School, will be enrolled at Liberty High School for the 2017–18 school year.

Athletics
The school mascot, the Lightning, was announced in November 2014. Athletic teams bearing the moniker began practice in December 2015 competing at the freshman level with students that would be moving to Liberty from West High. Full membership in the Mississippi Valley Conference is to be granted in the 2018–2019 school year, when Liberty begins fielding a varsity football team. During the inaugural year, Liberty had varsity programs in volleyball, girls’ and boys’ cross country, boys’ golf (fall), girls’ and boys’ basketball, wrestling, girls’ and boys’ soccer, girls’ and boys’ track and field, girls’ golf (spring), baseball and softball competing as an independent while football was only offered at the freshman and sophomore levels.

See also
List of high schools in Iowa

References

2017 establishments in Iowa
Educational institutions established in 2017
Schools in Johnson County, Iowa
Public high schools in Iowa
Buildings and structures in Johnson County, Iowa